Sara Aboobacker (30 June 1936 – 10 January 2023) was an Indian Kannada writer of novels and short stories, and a translator.

Early life and education 

Sara was born in Kasaragod, Kerala on 30 June 1936, to Pudiyapuri Ahmad and Zainabi Ahmad. She had four brothers. She was one of the first girls in her community of Muslim families in Kasaragod to be educated, graduating from a local Kannada school. She was married after school, and went on to have four sons. Aboobacker once stated that her desire to further her education was constrained by community norms that restricted female access to higher education, and that she was only able to obtain a library membership in 1963.

Career

As a writer

Writing style and themes 

Aboobacker's books largely focus on the lives of Muslim women living in the Kasaragod region, bordering the Indian states of Kerala and Karnataka. She focuses on issues of equality and injustice within her community, critiquing patriarchal systems within religious and familial groups. Her writing style is direct and simple, and she has stated that she prefers a realist approach to literature, prioritizing the expression of social concerns over stylistic embellishments. Her books have dealt with complex subjects such as marital rape, communal and religious violence, and individual autonomy.

Published works and adaptations 

In 1981, Aboobacker published her first article, an editorial on communal harmony, in a local monthly Kannada-language magazine, Lankesh Patrike. Following this she began writing stories and novels, focusing on her own community, the Beary people, a Muslim community living across parts of the Indian states of Karnataka and Kerala.

Aboobacker is most well-known for her first novel, Chandragiriya Theeradalli (1981), which was later translated into English by Vanamala Vishwanatha as Breaking Ties and into Marathi by Shivarama Padikkal in 1991. The novel was initially published in serialised form in a local monthly magazine, Lankesh Patrike, and later republished as a novel. It focuses on the life of Nadira, a young Muslim woman attempting to assert independence first from her father, and later, from her husband.  Chandragiriya Theeradalli has been adapted for the theatre, with a script written by Roopa Koteshwar being produced in 2016. In 2019, a district court ruled in favour of Aboobacker in a suit she had filed for copyright infringement against the makers of the film Byari. The film had won the Swarna Kamal Award at the 59th National Film Festival in 2011. The District Court found that it was based primarily on Aboobacker's book, Chandragiriya Theeradalli and that the producers had not obtained her permission to adapt the book for their film.

Her novel, Vrajagalu (1988) is currently being made into a film produced by Devendra Reddy, titled Saaravajra. The film stars actress Anu Prabhakar Mukherjee as the protagonist, Nafisa, and traces her life from childhood to old age, as she navigates marriage, and divorce within the Muslim community in Kasargod.

From 1994, Aboobacker has been publishing her works under her own publication company, Chandragiri Prakashan.

As a translator 

Aboobaker has translated into Kannada books by T. V. Eachara Warrier, Kamala Das and B. M. Suhara.

Awards and honours 

Aboobacker has received a number of awards for her contributions to literature.

 In 1984, she received the Karnataka Sahitya Akademi Award.
 In 1987, she received the Anupama Nirajan Award. 
 From 1990 to 1994, she served as president of a local writers' association, the Karavali Lekhakiyara mattu Vachakiyara Sangha.
 In 1995, she received the Kannada Rajyotsava Award.
 In 1996, she received the Rathnamma Heggade Mahila Sahitya Award.
 Daana Chintamani Attimabbe Award in 2001 by the Government of Karnataka
 In 2006, she received the Nadoja Award from Hampi University for her contributions to literature.
 In 2008, she was awarded an honorary doctorate from Mangalore University.

Literary works

Novels 

 1981 - Chandragiriya Teeradalli (Bengaluru: Patrike Prakasana, 1981. This was translated into English by Vanamala Vishwanatha as Breaking Ties (1982)
 1985 - Sahana (Bengaluru: Chandragiri Prakashana) 
 1988 - Vajragalu (Bengaluru: Navakarnataka Prakasana)
 1991 - Kadana Viraama
 1994 - Suliyalli Sikkavaru (Bengaluru: Chandragiri Prakashana, 2013) 
 1997 - Tala Odeda Doniyali (Directorate Of Kannada And Culture)
 2004  - Panjara

Short story collections 

 1989 - Chappaligalu (Bengaluru: Chandragiri Prakashana) 
 1992 - Payana
 1996 - Ardha Ratriyalli Huttida Kusu
 1999 - Kheddah
 2004 - Sumayya 
 2007 - Gaganasakhi

Translations (from Malayalam to Kannada) 

 1992 - Manomi by Kamala Das
 1998 - Bale by B.M. Sohara
 2000 - Naninnu Nidrisuve by P. K. Balakrishnan
 2009 - Dharmada Hesarinalli by R.B. Srikumar

Non-fiction 

 2010 - Hottu Kanthuva Munna (an autobiography)

References 

1936 births
2023 deaths
Kannada-language writers
People from Kasaragod district
Indian women novelists
Indian women short story writers
20th-century Indian novelists
20th-century Indian translators
20th-century Indian women writers
20th-century Indian short story writers
Novelists from Kerala
Women writers from Kerala
Indian women translators
Translators to Kannada
21st-century Indian novelists
21st-century Indian translators
21st-century Indian women writers
21st-century Indian short story writers
Translators from Malayalam